Smokey's Family Robinson is an album by Smokey Robinson, released in 1976. The title is a pun on The Swiss Family Robinson.

The album peaked at No. 57 on the Billboard 200.

Track listing
All tracks composed by Smokey Robinson; except where indicated.
"When You Came" - 5:24
"Get Out of Town" (Smokey Robinson, Rose Ella Jones) - 4:43
"Do Like I Do" (Smokey Robinson, Rose Ella Jones) - 4:40
"Open" (Smokey Robinson, Marv Tarplin, Pamela Moffett) - 3:50
"So in Love" - 4:40
"Like Nobody Can" - 4:10
"Castles Made of Sand" - 4:49

Personnel
 Smokey Robinson – lead vocals, rhythm arrangements
 Reginald "Sonny" Burke – keyboards, rhythm arrangements
 Marvin Tarplin – guitar
 Scott Edwards – bass guitar
 Wayne Tweed – bass guitar
 Joseph A. Brown, Jr. – drums
 James "Alibe" Sledge – percussion
 Michael Jacobsen – electric cello, saxophone
 Fred Smith – horns, horn arrangements
 Ivory Stone Davis – backing vocals
 Carolyn Dennis – backing vocals
 Patricia Henley – backing vocals
 Melba Joyce – backing vocals

Production
 Producer – Smokey Robinson
 Engineers – Guy Costa and Smokey Robinson
 Art Direction – Frank Mulvey 
 Photography – Sam Emerson
 Graphics – Gribbit!
 Management – Don Foster

References

Smokey Robinson albums
1976 albums
Albums produced by Smokey Robinson
Tamla Records albums